Julián Rebolledo is an American actor, best known for his role as the voice of the neurotic father Jake Morgendorffer on the MTV animated series Daria, Paul from the Pokémon anime, and as Raul Passos in the 2012 video game, Max Payne 3.

Early life and education 
A native of Tulsa, Oklahoma, Rebolledo graduated from Union High School in 1990. He later graduated from the Manhattan School of Music.

Career
In 2000, Rebolledo appeared on the Law & Order episode "Vaya Con Dios", as Lt. Orra. In 2001, Rebolledo co-founded  Shut Up and Talk with Sean Reyes, an audio post-production facility specializing in voice talent. Since its founding, Rebolledo has provided voice-overs for hundreds of commercials.  In 2004, he toured the United States  in the musical Heaven Help Us!, performing as one of the leads, a Spanish valet who channels Dean Martin.

Rebolledo was a featured voice in the Nick Jr. series Go, Diego, Go!.

Filmography

Film

Television

Video games

External links

Heaven Help Us! The Musical - Web site of the 2004 musical
Shut Up and Talk website

American male voice actors
Living people
Manhattan School of Music alumni
American male television actors
American male film actors
American male video game actors
20th-century American male actors
21st-century American male actors
Year of birth missing (living people)